The 2013 Rostelecom Cup was the final event of six in the 2013–14 ISU Grand Prix of Figure Skating, a senior-level international invitational competition series. It was held at the Luzhniki Small Sports Arena in Moscow on November 22–24. Medals were awarded in the disciplines of men's singles, ladies' singles, pair skating, and ice dancing. Skaters earned points toward qualifying for the 2013–14 Grand Prix Final.

Eligibility
Skaters who reached the age of 14 by July 1, 2013 were eligible to compete on the senior Grand Prix circuit.

Entries
The entries were as follows.

Kevin Reynolds withdrew. He was replaced by Misha Ge. On 13 November 2013, it was announced that Evgeni Plushenko had withdrawn from the event due to injury. He was replaced by Konstantin Menshov. Brian Joubert withdrew and was not replaced.

In the ladies' event, Kaetlyn Osmond withdrew and was not replaced.

In the pairs' event, Britney Simpson / Matthew Blackmer withdrew and were replaced by Lindsay Davis / Rockne Brubaker.

Results

Men

Ladies

Pairs

Ice dancing

References

External links
 2013 Rostelecom Cup

2013 in figure skating
Rostelecom Cup
2013 in Russian sport